Dandelions (Taraxacum species) are used as food plants by the caterpillars of a number of Lepidoptera species, including:

 Arctiidae
 Hypercompe scribonia (giant leopard moth)
 Geometridae
 Idaea aversata (riband wave)
 Idaea biselata (small fan-footed wave)
 Hepialidae
 Triodia sylvina (orange swift)
 Noctuidae
 Antitype chi (grey chi)
 Axylia putris (flame)
 Cucullia umbratica (shark)
 Discestra trifolii (nutmeg)
 Eupsilia transversa (satellite)
 Naenia typica (gothic)
 Noctua pronuba (large yellow underwing)
 Xestia c-nigrum (setaceous Hebrew character)
 Tortricidae
 Celypha rufana

External links

Dandelions
+Lepidoptera